Adam Carr Bell (November 11, 1847 – October 30, 1912) was a Canadian politician.

Born in Pictou, Nova Scotia, the son of Basil Bell and Mary Carr, Bell was educated in New Glasgow, Sackville Academy, and Glasgow University. From 1876 to 1877, he was the first mayor of New Glasgow, Nova Scotia (he was mayor again from 1884 to 1885). He was elected to the Nova Scotia House of Assembly in 1878. In 1882, he was Provincial Secretary in the cabinet of John Thompson. From 1882 to 1887 he was the Conservative Party leader and Leader of the Opposition.

In 1896, he was elected to the House of Commons of Canada for the electoral district of Pictou. A Conservative, he was re-elected in 1900. He was defeated in 1904 and 1911.

In 1911, he was summoned to the Senate of Canada on the advice of Robert Borden representing the senatorial division of Pictou, Nova Scotia. He died in office the following year in 1912.

Electoral history

References

1847 births
1912 deaths
Canadian senators from Nova Scotia
Conservative Party of Canada (1867–1942) MPs
Conservative Party of Canada (1867–1942) senators
Members of the House of Commons of Canada from Nova Scotia
Progressive Conservative Association of Nova Scotia MLAs
People from Pictou County
Mayors of places in Nova Scotia
Nova Scotia political party leaders